Ann Bradford Davis (May 3, 1926 – June 1, 2014) was an American actress. She achieved prominence for her role in the NBC situation comedy The Bob Cummings Show (1955–1959), for which she twice won the Primetime Emmy Award for Outstanding Supporting Actress in a Comedy Series, but she was best known for playing the part of Alice Nelson, the housekeeper in ABC's The Brady Bunch (1969–1974).

Early life
Davis was born in Schenectady, New York, the daughter of Marguerite (née Stott) and Cassius Miles Davis. She had an identical twin, Harriet, and an older sister and brother, Elizabeth (1917-1974) and Evans (1921-2005). When she was three, she and her family moved to Erie in northwestern Pennsylvania. She graduated from Strong Vincent High School and later from the University of Michigan in Ann Arbor. She originally enrolled as a pre-medical major; however, she changed her mind and went into drama after seeing her older brother's performance of Oklahoma! Davis graduated in 1948 with a degree in drama and speech.

Career

In the 1953–1954 season, Davis appeared as a musical judge on ABC's Jukebox Jury.

Davis's first television success was as Charmaine "Schultzy" Schultz in The Bob Cummings Show, 1955–1959. She auditioned for the role because her friend's boyfriend was a casting director and recommended her for the part. She won the Primetime Emmy Award for Outstanding Supporting Actress in a Comedy Series twice out of four nominations for this role.

She appeared on January 23, 1958, as a guest star on The Ford Show, Starring Tennessee Ernie Ford. On February 9, 1960, Davis received a star on the Hollywood Walk of Fame. In this period, Davis also focused on theater.  As early as 1958 she appeared in a national touring company of the Thornton Wilder play The Matchmaker, costarring her Bob Cummings Show castmate, Lyle Talbot, who played Bob's Air Force buddy, and in about 1960 she replaced Carol Burnett in the starring role of Princess Winnifred in the Broadway production of the musical Once Upon a Mattress.

In the 1965–1966 television season, Davis appeared as Miss Wilson, a physical education teacher at a private girls' academy in John Forsythe's single-season NBC sitcom, The John Forsythe Show.

For a period in the 1960s and 1970s, Davis was known for her appearances in television commercials for the Ford Motor Company, particularly for the mid-sized Ford Fairlane models. Davis was also featured in commercials for Minute Rice in Canada until the mid-1980s. During this period she also performed as a stand-up comedian; before Sherwood Schwartz could cast her in The Brady Bunch, Paramount Studios had to buy her out of a multiweek booking in Seattle.

From 1969 to 1974, Davis played housekeeper Alice Nelson in The Brady Bunch television series. She later returned to take part in various Brady Bunch television movies, including The Brady Girls Get Married (1981) and A Very Brady Christmas (1988). She also reprised her role as Alice Nelson in two short-lived Brady Bunch spin-off television series: The Brady Brides (1981) and The Bradys (1990), both of which lasted only six episodes. She also made a cameo appearance as a truck driver named "Schultzy", a reference to her days on The Bob Cummings Show, in The Brady Bunch Movie in 1995. In 1994, Davis published a cookbook, Alice's Brady Bunch Cookbook, with Brady Bunch inspired recipes. The book also includes recipes from cast members.

In the early 1990s, Davis returned to theater. She performed in a production of Arsenic and Old Lace, and both the Broadway production and a world tour of Crazy for You.

Davis never completely retired from acting; in her later years she was the celebrity spokeswoman in several Shake 'n Bake commercials, and later appeared in several disposable mop commercials for Swiffer. She also appeared in a number of Brady Bunch reunion projects, most recently TV Land's The Brady Bunch 35th Anniversary Reunion Special: Still Brady After All These Years. On April 22, 2007, The Brady Bunch was awarded the TV Land Pop Culture Award on the 5th annual TV Land Awards. Davis and other cast members accepted the award, and she received a standing ovation.

Personal life

In 1976, Davis sold her home in Los Angeles to move to Denver, Colorado, where she joined an Episcopal community led by Bishop William C. Frey. The community later relocated to Ambridge in Beaver County in far western Pennsylvania after Frey became dean of the seminary Trinity School for Ministry. Davis had long been a volunteer for the Episcopal Church, working at the General Convention, attending services at churches around the country.

Davis never married nor was she publicly known to have been romantically linked to anyone.

Death
Davis died at the age of 88 on June 1, 2014, at a hospital in San Antonio, Texas. Earlier in the day, she had sustained a subdural hematoma from a fall in her bathroom in her San Antonio residence, in which she lived with Bishop Frey and his wife, Barbara. Sources close to her say she was in excellent health for her age and her death was a complete shock. She is cremated and interred in the Saint Helena's Columbarium and Memorial Gardens in Boerne, Texas.

Works

Film

Television

Stage

Awards and nominations
Davis received four Primetime Emmy Award nominations, resulting in two awards, for her portrayal of Charmaine "Schultzy" Schultz on The Bob Cummings Show.

On February 9, 1960, Davis also received a star on the Hollywood Walk of Fame at 7048 Hollywood Boulevard. She also received TV Land Awards in 2004, 2006, and 2007 for her portrayal of Alice Nelson, the housekeeper on The Brady Bunch.

References

External links

 
 
 Ann B. Davis Archive of American Television Interview
 

1926 births
2014 deaths
20th-century American actresses
Accidental deaths in Texas
Actresses from New York (state)
American film actresses
American television actresses
Accidental deaths from falls
Outstanding Performance by a Supporting Actress in a Comedy Series Primetime Emmy Award winners
People from Beaver County, Pennsylvania
Actors from Erie, Pennsylvania
Actresses from Los Angeles
Actresses from San Antonio
Actors from Schenectady, New York
American twins
University of Michigan School of Music, Theatre & Dance alumni
Actresses from Denver
Trinity School for Ministry alumni
20th-century American Episcopalians
21st-century American women